SkyBox Labs Inc. is a Canadian video game developer located in Burnaby, British Columbia. Founded in 2011 by Derek MacNeil, Shyang Kong and Steven Silvester formerly from EA Vancouver, they are mostly known for their work with Xbox Game Studios on the Halo, Age of Empires and Minecraft franchises.

History

Formation

SkyBox Labs co-founders, Derek MacNeil, Shyang Kong and Steven Silvester worked together at EA Vancouver from 2004 to 2010 on the FIFA, Need for Speed, NBA Live and NHL franchises, where MacNeil was development director while Kong was senior producer and Silvester technical director, when they decided to set up an independent studio in Burnaby, Vancouver.

Initially being a contract-based studio, in the year of its founding SkyBox Labs signed an agreement with publisher Microsoft Studios (late renamed to Xbox Game Studios), which liked the studio and its culture, being a partner publisher of SkyBox, outhough not owning them.

Development

SkyBox Labs collaborated with Relentless Software on their first title, Kinect Nat Geo TV, which was developed for Xbox 360 with Kinect. It was published by Microsoft Studios and released on September 18, 2012. It received mostly positive reviews, scoring 78 out of 100 on review aggregator site Metacritic.

SkyBox Labs continued working with Microsoft Studios after that, co-developing an expansion pack for Age of Empires II HD called The Forgotten with Forgotten Empires, which was released on November 7, 2013. They also worked on a remaster of Age of Mythology called Age of Mythology: Extended Edition, which was released on May 8, 2014, and received mixed reviews, scoring 66 out of 100 on Metacritic, they also co-developed a new expansion for Age of Mythology: Extended Edition called Tale of the Dragon together with Forgotten Empires, which was released on January 28, 2016. They also developed a remaster of Rise of Nations, Rise of Nations Extended Edition, released on June 12, 2014.

On June 17, 2014, EA Sports UFC was a collaboration between EA Canada and SkyBox Games. It was the first UFC game after THQ lost the license and it was sold to Electronic Arts. Final product received mixed, but mostly positive reviews, with Xbox One version scoring 71 out of 100 on Metacritic and PlayStation 4 version scoring 69 out of 100.

Their next work was a simulation, sandbox video game called Project Spark, co-developed with Team Dakota and published by Microsoft Studios. It was released on October 8, 2014.

Japanese company DeNA published their next two video games, first being Military Masters for iOS and Android, which was released on December 4, 2014, and second being Protocol Zero for Samsung Gear VR, which was released on January 5, 2015.

SkyBox Labs then developed and self-published Parade Runner for iOS and Android, which was released on April 9, 2015. Company is also working on a PC game called Lethal Tactics, which was released in Early Access on Steam on May 20, 2015.

In 2018, after E3, SkyBox announced a new partnership with 343 Industries and Microsoft, where the studio will be co-developing Halo Infinite, the next major entry to the Halo franchise.

SkyBox Labs was acquired by NetEase Games in January 2023.

Games

References

External links

Companies based in Burnaby
Privately held companies of Canada
Video game companies of Canada
Video game development companies
Canadian companies established in 2011
Video game companies established in 2011
2011 establishments in British Columbia
2023 mergers and acquisitions
Canadian subsidiaries of foreign companies
NetEase